Alexander Scriabin's Prelude, Op. 49, No. 2 is the second of his Trois Morceaux Op. 49 (Three Pieces), which were written in 1905. It is notated in F major, 3/4 measure, with a speed of 69 per quarter note, and lasts for 23 measures (and an upbeat). It should be expressed Bruscamente irato (very irate).

Recordings
There are recordings by Glenn Gould (from 1973) and Mikhail Pletnev (from 1996).
 The Glenn Gould Edition: Chopin Piano Sonata No. 3, Mendelssohn Songs without Words etc. (S2K 52622) (also featured on volume 11 of the video Ecstasy and Wit (Sony SHV 48417)
 Mikhail Pletnev: Scriabin: 24 Preludes, Sonatas 4 & 10, etc. (2002)

External links

Preludes by Alexander Scriabin
1905 compositions
Compositions in F major